Antsirabato Airport is an airport in Antalaha, Madagascar .

Airlines and destinations

This airport can be accessed by the National road 53. It is in a distance of 12 km from Antalaha.

External links

References

Airports in Madagascar
Sava Region